State Route 300 (SR 300) is a short road located entirely in Tuscaloosa County, Alabama, connecting Fosters with Interstate 20/Interstate 59 (I-20/I-59); the route is also known as County Route 10 or Holley Springs Road.

Route description
The road begins in Fosters at the intersection of U.S. Route 11 (US 11), US 43, and County Road 10 and continues south completely surrounded by forest. The route ends right after the junction with I-20/I-59, after that there is a small dead end road.

Major intersections

References

External links

300
Transportation in Tuscaloosa County, Alabama
State highways in the United States shorter than one mile